A bustier (alternatively bustiere) is a form-fitting garment for women traditionally worn as lingerie. Its primary purpose is to push up the bust by tightening against the upper midriff and forcing the breasts up while gently shaping the waist. Nowadays, it might also be worn as a push-up bra under a low-backed dress or as a camisole for outerwear. The bustier can also be worn as a half-slip under sheer upper garments if a bold display of the midriff is not desired.

A bustier resembles a basque, but it is shorter. It reaches down only to the ribs or waist.

Modern bustiers are often made with mesh panels rather than the traditional boning.

Origin 
These delicate garments were representative and a symbol of nobility for women with power since 2000 BC. At the beginning these were not used as underwear, but were a complete, one-piece garment, like a dress, but in the 16th century, specifically in Italy, their design varied until they had the representative style that we can appreciate today.

See also
 Bodystocking
 Bra
 Bralette
 Corset

References

1980s fashion
Foundation garments
Lingerie

Women's clothing